Villa-Lobos: A Life of Passion is a 2000 Brazilian drama film directed by Zelito Viana. It was entered into the 22nd Moscow International Film Festival. It won the 2nd Grande Prêmio Cinema Brasil for Best Score, and the 5th Brazilian Film Festival of Miami for Best Art Direction. Its production started in 1997 as Villa Lobos - História de Uma Paixão.

Plot
The film is a docudrama of Brazilian composer Heitor Villa-Lobos, portraying him at various ages.

Cast
 Antônio Fagundes as Heitor Villa-Lobos
 Marcos Palmeira as young Heitor Villa-Lobos
 Letícia Spiller as Mindinha
 Ana Beatriz Nogueira as Lucília
 José Wilker as Donizetti
 Marieta Severo as Noemia
 Othon Bastos as Raul
 Emílio de Melo as Arthur Rubinstein
 Antonio Pitanga as Joaquim

References

External links
 
 

2000 films
2000 drama films
2000 biographical drama films
2000s Portuguese-language films
Brazilian biographical drama films